The Bunshun Kiichigo Awards (文春きいちご賞 - Bunshun Kiichigo Shou), or Bunshun Raspberry Awards, is an award presented in recognition of the worst in film.  It was founded in 2005 by the Japanese publication company Bungeishunjū, Ltd.  Each year, up to 10 movies are nominated for the award (although in 2008 there were 11 nominees).

The first film to win 1st Place was Devilman (the live-action adaptation of Go Nagai's anime/manga series), which had already received negative reviews in Japan.

The Bunshun Kiichigo Awards are not limited strictly to domestic films; American and foreign films were selected as candidates as well.  They include Thunderbirds (the live-action remake of Gerry Anderson's classic puppet show), the Hong Kong film 2046, War of the Worlds (the 2005 remake), and The Da Vinci Code.

Worst Movie Awards

2004
1st Place: Devilman
2nd Place: Casshern
3rd Place: Umineko
4th Place: Howl's Moving Castle
5th Place: The Village
6th Place: Godzilla: Final Wars
7th Place: Thunderbirds
8th Place (Tied): 2046
8th Place (Tied): Cutie Honey
8th Place (Tied): The Chronicles of Riddick

2005
1st Place: Shinobi: Heart Under Blade
2nd Place: Takeshis'
3rd Place: War of the Worlds
4th Place: Sengoku Jieitai 1549
5th Place: Princess Raccoon
6th Place (Tied): Spring Snow
6th Place (Tied): Alexander
6th Place (Tied): Kita no Zero-Nen
9th Place (Tied): Tonbi ga Kururito
9th Place (Tied): Tokyo Tower

2006
1st Place: Tales from Earthsea
2nd Place: Sinking of Japan
3rd Place: The Da Vinci Code
4th Place: Nada Sōsō
5th Place: The Promise
6th Place: Limit of Love: Umizaru
7th Place: Yeonriji
8th Place: Rough
9th Place: Angel-A
10th Place: Christmas on July 24th Avenue

2007
1st Place: Genghis Khan: To the Ends of the Earth and Sea
2nd Place: Koizora
3rd Place: Last Love
4th Place: Ai no Rukeichi
5th Place: Glory to the Filmmaker!
6th Place: Dororo
7th Place: Saiyuki
8th Place (Tied): Ore wa, Kimi no Tame ni Koso Shini ni Iku
8th Place (Tied): Hero
10th Place (Tied): Inland Empire
10th Place (Tied): The Mourning Forest

Notes

External links
 Bunshun Website's listing of the Winners of 2007. Archived from the original on 2008-03-09
 Slashdot Japan's listings of the 2006 Bunshun Kiichigo Award Winners

Ironic and humorous awards
Japanese film awards
Awards established in 2004
Lists of worsts
2004 establishments in Japan
Awards disestablished in 2008
2008 disestablishments in Japan